Kapawe'no 230 is an Indian reserve of the Kapawe'no First Nation in Alberta, located within Big Lakes County. It is 25 kilometres northeast of High Prairie.

References

Indian reserves in Alberta